Gugi-cha or goji tea is a traditional Chinese/Korean tea made from dried goji berries or leaves. Traditionally, the tea was made with young goji leaves. Today, mature leaves or, more commonly, berries are used. The tea made with berries may be called gugija-cha or goji berry tea, while the tea made with leaves is referred to as gugiyeop-cha or goji leaf tea.

Preparation 

See also 
 Omija-cha

References 

Herbal tea
Chinese tea
Korean tea
Traditional Chinese medicine